, commonly known as Odakyū, is a major railway company based in Tokyo, Japan, best known for its Romancecar series of limited express trains from Tokyo to Odawara, Enoshima, Tama New Town, and Hakone.

The Odakyu Electric Railway Company forms the core of the Odakyu Group, which comprises 101 companies (as of July 14, 2017) and includes the Enoshima Electric Railway, Hakone Tozan Railway, and  hotel. It is listed on the Tokyo Stock Exchange and is a constituent of the Nikkei 225.

History

Pre-WWII

The  line from Shinjuku to Odawara opened for service on 1 April 1927. Unlike the Odawara line, rarely were pre-World War II Japanese private railways constructed with double-track and fully electrified from the first day of operation. Two years later, on 1 April 1929, the Enoshima Line was added.

The abbreviation Odakyu was made popular by the title song of the 1929 movie Tōkyō kōshinkyoku and eventually became the official name of the railroad on March 1, 1941.

On 1 May 1942, Odakyu merged with the Tokyo-Yokohama Electric Railway company (now Tokyu Corporation), which controlled all private railway services west and south of Tokyo by the end of World War II.

Post-WWII

The company regained its independence on June 1, 1948, and it obtained a large amount of Hakone Tozan Railway stocks, instead of separating Keio Inokashira Line for Keio Corporation. Odakyu restarted Non-stop Limited Express service between Shinjuku and Odawara in 1948. In 1950, Odakyu trains ran through to Hakone-Yumoto on Hakone Tozan Line. Odakyu operated the first Romancecar (1710 series) limited express in 1951.

After the 1950s, due to rapid Japanese economic growth, Odakyu was faced with an explosive increase of population along with its lines. Commuter passengers had to use very crowded trains every morning, and complained strongly with the delay of improvements from the railway company. Odakyu began construction on the - "Shinjuku Station Great Improvement Project" setting 5 lines and 10 platforms long enough for 10 standard commuter cars with service on the Chiyoda Line, among others. Plans for a four-track system in 1964 were prevented by residents of Setagaya Ward in Tokyo, as such the system remains uncompleted. The Setagaya Residents' opposition set the stage for a long-term and remarkable case in the courts and legislature. Odakyu could not take main part of transport from Tama New Town Area, though Odakyu started the operation of Tama Line in 1974. To serve its Mukōgaoka-Yūen Amusement Park, Odakyu operated the Mukōgaoka-Yūen Monorail Line between Mukōgaoka-Yūen and Mukōgaoka-Yūen-Seimon (2 stations) beginning in 1966 using a Lockheed Corporation style monorail system; the system was closed in 2001 when the amusement park was shut down.

Post-Millennium

Since 2000, Odakyū has been adding track in both directions from Izumi-Tamagawa Station, on Tama River, the border station of Tokyo, to just outside Setagaya-Daita Station for expanding the availability of express trains, especially for morning commuter service. The lines between Setagaya-Daita and Higashi-Kitazawa Station are still under construction, however. Odakyu announced that the bottle-neck will be resolved by 2013.

All of its lines are double- or quadruple-tracked within Tokyo Metropolis as of March 2018, a project first decided in December 1964 but due to NIMBY land acquisition difficulties, complex and expensive workarounds were constructed and finished, taking a half century. The main or Odawara Line acts as a bypass route for the Tōkaidō Main Line from Tokyo to western Kanagawa. These tests also provided important data on high-speed electric multiple units (EMU), which Japanese National Railways (JNR) used for its limited express EMUs, 151 series, and 0 Series Shinkansen introduced in the early 1960s.

Odakyu celebrated its 80th anniversary in April 2007. The 50th anniversary of the Romancecar was celebrated in September 2007.

Station numbers were introduced to all Odakyū Line stations in 2014, with stations numbered using the prefix "OH".

Odakyu are the current shirt sponsors of football club Machida Zelvia.

On 6 August 2021, a mass stabbing incident occurred on one of its commuter services when a man stabbed nine passengers, seriously injuring a woman before trying to ignite a fire on the compartment. The man escaped and was arrested hours later.

Lines
Odakyu owns three railway lines directly, and another three lines via subsidiaries. It also operates trains onto the Tokyo Metro Chiyoda Line, JR East Jōban Line, and JR Central Gotemba Line.

 Not including the connecting branch between Odawara Line and JR Central Gotemba Line near Shin-Matsuda Station.
This service began in 1978 between Hon-Atsugi and  stations.
Limited express Mt. Fuji trains travel from Shinjuku through on the JR Central Gotemba Line to Gotemba Station eight times a day.

Train classification
(As of March 17, 2018 timetable revision)

Romancecar limited express services require a supplementary surcharge.

Limited express service

Shinjuku Station routes
Commuter service is shown on each line's page.

 Mt. Fuji trains run on the connecting branch line just before Shin-Matsuda from Shinjuku and stops at Matsuda on the Gotemba Line. Matsuda and Shin-Matsuda are treated as the same station.
 Home Way trains run from Shinjuku every evening after 18:00. There is no service to Shinjuku.

Tokyo Metro routes
Commuter services are shown on each line's page.

 At Yoyogi-Uehara, all trains pause, but there is no service for passengers; Odakyū and Tokyo Metro change their operating staff at the station.
 On weekday mornings, Metro Sagami trains run once from Hon-Atsugi to Kita-Senju.
 On weekday evenings, Metro Homeway trains run twice from Hon-Atsugi to Kita-Senju and once from Ōtemachi to Hon-Atsugi.
 On weekends and holidays, Metro Hakone trains run between Kita-Senju and Hakone-Yumoto four times; Metro Sagami (once in the morning) and Metro Homeway (once in the evening) trains also run between Kita-Senju and Hon-Atsugi.
 Once or twice per month, Metro Sagami and Metro Homeway become Bay Resort trains, traveling between Shin-Kiba and Hon-Atsugi. They travel to/from the Tokyo Metro Yūrakuchō and Chiyoda lines.

Legend

Rolling stock

Romancecar sets
3000 series "SE" (1957–1991)
3100 series "NSE" (1963–2000)
7000 series "LSE" (1980–2018)
10000 series "HiSE" (1987–2012)
20000 series "RSE" (1991–2012)
30000 series "EXE/EXEalpha" (introduced 1996)
50000 series "VSE" (2005-2022)
60000 series "MSE" (introduced 2008)
70000 series "GSE" (introduced 2018)

Commuter sets
Current
1000 series (introduced 1988)
2000 series (introduced 1995)
3000 series (introduced 2002)
4000 series (introduced 2007)
8000 series (introduced 1982)
5000 series (introduced 2019)
Former
5000 series (1969–2012)
9000 series (1972–2006)

Odakyu Electric Railway in media

The Odakyu Railway has been included in several Japanese language train simulator programs as well as the English language Microsoft Train Simulator program. Microsoft Train Simulator includes the railway's Odawara and Hakone Tozan lines, collectively referred to as the "Tokyo-Hakone" route, with the 2000 series commuter trainset and the 7000 series "LSE" Romancecar trainset being player driveable. Several "activities", or scenarios, are included.

Various Odakyu add-ins are available for the BVE Train Simulator, a freeware cab view train simulator for Microsoft Windows.

References

Bibliography

External links

 Odakyu Electric Railway 
 Odakyu Electric Railway 
 Evolution of Railway Technology (prominently mentions Odakyu 3000 series SE Romance Car trainsets) 
 Shimochika-navi (concerning construction between Higashi-Kitazawa and Setagaya-Daita stations) 

 
Companies listed on the Tokyo Stock Exchange
Transport companies based in Tokyo
Railway companies of Japan
Japanese companies established in 1948
Railway companies established in 1948